Yucumo is a small town located in the José Ballivián Province in the Beni Department in northern Bolivia.

References

Populated places in Beni Department